"Tell Me It's Over" is a song by Canadian singer-songwriter Avril Lavigne, released as the second single from her sixth studio album Head Above Water (2019) on December 12, 2018 along with the album pre-order. It follows the album's lead single, "Head Above Water". Lavigne posted the cover art and announced the release date on her social media on December 5. She had previously posted pictures from the video accompanied by the line "Cause it don't feel like it's over whenever you're closing the door".

Composition
"Tell Me It's Over" is a Memphis soul and rhythm and blues ballad. Lavigne explained in a statement that the song is about "being strong, finally putting your foot down and closing the door on a relationship that you know is wrong after time and time again of falling for their games." About her inspirations to write the song, Lavigne said, "The vocals and the lyrics are very vulnerable which is reflective of the feelings I had in relationships like these. I wanted to write something classic and have been inspired by some of the timeless queens I listen to everyday at home, Billie Holiday, Ella Fitzgerald, Aretha Franklin and Etta James."

Music video
The song's accompanying music video premiered on December 12, 2018, on Lavigne's YouTube channel. It was directed by Erica Silverman. It finds Lavigne sharing a love-filled Christmas with her boyfriend before things start to fall apart and he smashes her phone on the ground amid another fight.

Charts

Release history

References

2018 singles
Avril Lavigne songs
Songs written by Avril Lavigne
Songs written by Ryan Cabrera
Songs written by Johan Carlsson (musician)
Soul ballads
Rhythm and blues ballads
Canadian rhythm and blues songs
2010s ballads